Talanga is a town, with a population of 19,860 (2020 calculation), and a municipality in the Honduran department of Francisco Morazán.

It lies on the highway connecting Tegucigalpa with the department of Olancho.  Talanga is a medium-sized municipality relying heavily on agriculture.  Its most important crops include corn, sugar cane and livestock fodder.

Talanga has a very good indoor market with produce, meat, pots and pans, and other household goods. There are about seven well-stocked hardware stores, as well as two internet cafes. The town square was recently built with concrete fixtures and a basketball court. There is a hill with a cross near the town center with an excellent view of the town and surrounding area. The people of Talanga are very friendly and one would be hardpressed to walk the main street without having people say "buenas" and starting conversations.

References 

Municipalities of the Francisco Morazán Department